TM Production LLC is an Armenian production company founded in 2009 by Thomas Martirosyan, who holds position of General Manager of the company. Company is one of the leading music labels and music production companies in Armenia. Since 2009 the company organizes concerts of different genres and in different formats.

About the company
TM Production provides audio and video production with full cycle: starting from album recording, concert shooting, artist photo shoots, cover design and finishing with CD/DVD manufacturing and distribution. The aim of the company is to present Armenian sacred, folk, classic, rock and jazz music. 
TM Production collaborates with local artists and does artist management. Company also offers international artists booking.

Projects

Anthology of Armenian Jazz [2015]
This anthology encompasses a variation of styles used by the Armenian musicians. It includes recordings of 110 compositions that come in three categories: authors (selected compositions of the Armenian authors)
performers, orchestras & bands. Most of the recordings selected in the anthology have been made during concerts rather than in studios. As an exception, performances of our compatriots – outstanding representatives of soviet (Russian) jazz have been included in the anthology. We have a number of Armenian prominent jazz artists living and creating from out of Armenia, and in this light, compilation of the anthology Armenians in the world of foreign jazz is a timely matter too.
The authors admit that this anthology it is not as comprehensive as it could be, and probably not all the famed artists have been included in it due to the lack or loss of their recordings. The technical quality of the recordings may not please the fastidious audience either. Nonetheless, this anthology has a number of indisputable benefits.
The anthology features a variety of jazz styles including mainstream jazz, Latin jazz, jazz funk, jazz fusion, ethno jazz. 
Music is available for listening on official website

Artists
 Armen Babakhanian
 Armen Hyusnunts
 Davit Amalyan
 Gevorg Hakobyan
 Hrachya Melikyan
 Jivan Gasparyan
 Jivan Gasparyan Jr.
 Katuner
 Komitas Quartet
 Levon Malkhasyan
 Marine Ales
 Vahagn Hayrapetyan

Partners
 LaserCraft
 Converse Bank Corp
 ArArAt brandy
 Gazprom Armenia
 Tunecore

Awards

Five projects of TM Production were nominated for "Swallow" Armenian Music Awards of Ministry of Culture of Armenia on May 27, 2017. "Moks Mountains (Hayrik Mouradian)" CD has won "Best Album in Folk Genre" nomination and "Armenian Jazz Anthology" has won a Special Prize. Also nominated for "Best Classical Album", "Best Folk Album" and "Best Concert Program".

References

External links
 
 
 TM Production in TuneCore
 ArmJazz75 CD Collection with Gazprom Armenia
 TM Production CD/DVDs on buy.am
 CDs on Amazon.com
 Anthology of Armenian Jazz, Armenpress
 Anthology of Armenian Jazz, Armenianjazz.am
 Anthology of Armenian Jazz, Gazprom.ru

Record labels established in 2009
Armenian record labels
Music production companies
Companies of Armenia
Music organizations based in Armenia
Armenian companies established in 2009